Paul Jack (born 15 May 1965) is a former professional footballer, best known for playing for the Airdrieonians teams of the 1990s.

Managerial career
He was appointed manager of Bathgate Thistle in June 2009, but was sacked after 6 months in charge.

Honours
Airdrieonians
Scottish Challenge Cup: 1994–95

References

External links
 

1965 births
Association football defenders
Arbroath F.C. players
Airdrieonians F.C. (1878) players
Living people
Scottish footballers
Stirling Albion F.C. players
Scottish Football League players
Bathgate Thistle F.C. players
Bathgate Thistle F.C. non-playing staff